The Barrelman is a mascot logo used by two baseball teams in Milwaukee nicknamed "Brewers".

Introduction
The character was first used in the 1940s by the Milwaukee Brewers, a Minor League Baseball team based in Milwaukee, Wisconsin.  At the time, he was known as "Owgust".

With a beer barrel for a torso and tap for his nose, the Beer Barrel Man embodied the whimsical spirit of the minor leagues in the early to mid-twentieth century.

In the 1940s and 1950s, a whole series of Beer Barrel Men were used as logos by the club – pitching, batting, fielding balls and running the bases.  The December 1944 issue of Brewer News, the club's newsletter, depicted Owgust in a Santa Claus suit and long white beard.

The Beer Barrel Man was used until spring training of 1953, when the Boston Braves displaced the Brewers in Milwaukee.

Major Leagues
After the Braves moved to Atlanta after the 1965 season, former Braves minority owner Bud Selig announced the formation of a group to bring major league baseball club back to Milwaukee, adopting the batting Beer Barrel Man as his organization's logo.

When Selig's group was awarded the bankrupt American League Seattle Pilots franchise, he moved them to Milwaukee and the Beer Barrel Man made a comeback as the first logo of the new Milwaukee Brewers.  The Beer Barrel Man was used by the American League club through the 1977 season.

Legacy
Since then, he has made appearances on stadium giveaways, such as the 1999 Turn Ahead the Clock promotion, and has found new life on Cooperstown Collection merchandise.

The Beer Barrel Man was also featured in the winning design for the Brewers' "Design A Youniform" contest in 2013.  The contest received nearly 700 entries and the winning design, created by Ben Peters of Richfield, Minnesota, used the Beer Barrelman as the cap logo and sleeve patch.  This design was used in exhibitions games on March 22 in Arizona against the Chicago Cubs and once again March 30 in a game at Miller Park in Milwaukee against the Chicago White Sox.

In 2013, fans selected Bernie's Barrelman Ale as the name of a new craft beer, made by Leinenkugel's, in a poll on the team's website.

Return in 2015

On January 25, 2015, at their "On Deck" offseason event, the Brewers announced they would be bringing back the character, now named simply "Barrelman", as a costumed mascot.

Other Brewers mascots
Barrelman is sometimes confused with Bernie Brewer. Bernie has always been a human figure, first a regular man in lederhosen and then a costumed human mascot suit.

References

External links
 Official website of the Milwaukee Brewers
 The history of the Brewers' Beer Barrel Man

Major League Baseball team mascots
Milwaukee Brewers